The 2019–20 Sam Houston State Bearkats women's basketball team represented Sam Houston State University during the 2019–20 NCAA Division I women's basketball season. The Bearkats, led by second year head coach Ravon Justice, played their home games at the Bernard Johnson Coliseum as members of the Southland Conference. They finished the season 19–10, 14–6 in Southland play to finish in fourth place. Before they could play in the Southland women's tournament however, the tournament was cancelled due to the coronavirus pandemic.

Previous season
The Bearkats finished the season 16–13 overall, 11–7 in Southland play to finish in fifth place. As the No. 5 seed in the Southland women's tournament, they were defeated in the first round by Central Arkansas.

Roster
Sources:

Schedule
Sources:

|-
!colspan=9 style=| Non–conference games

|-
!colspan=9 style=| Southland Conference regular season

|-
!colspan=9 style=| Non–conference games

|-
!colspan=9 style=| Southland Conference regular season

|-
!colspan=12 style=| 2020 Hercules Tires Southland Basketball Tournament
|-

See also
2019–20 Sam Houston State Bearkats men's basketball team

References

Sam Houston Bearkats women's basketball seasons
Sam Houston State
Sam Houston State Bearkats basketball
Sam Houston State Bearkats basketball